Alexander Hamilton was a steamer built for the Hudson River Day Line in 1924 and named after Founding Father Alexander Hamilton. It was added to the National Register of Historic Places on March 25, 1977. The remains of the vessel are located adjacent to the Naval Weapons Station Earle pier in Middletown Township, Monmouth County, New Jersey, United States.

History
The Hudson River Day Line used Alexander Hamilton to transport passengers along the Hudson River between New York City and Albany, New York. In her later years, the run was shortened to a turnaround in Poughkeepsie.  The steamer was built by the Bethlehem Shipbuilding Corporation in 1924. The steamer operated from 1924 to 1971, first running with other Day Line Steamers, including the Peter Stuyvesant until the 1960s, when the company was purchased by the Circle Line, and became a one boat operation. She was over 300 feet in length and was built to handle more than 3,000 passengers.  Her replacement was the passenger vessel Dayliner, which took over the run. Alexander Hamilton spent time at the South Street Seaport and Brooklyn Navy Yard before being moved to Atlantic Highlands, New Jersey. In 1977, the Alexander Hamilton was moved to a temporary berth along the east side of the Navy pier in Middletown Township. During a storm, she caught fire and sank next to the pier on November 8, 1977.

Design
The steamer's propulsion system consisted of four Scotch marine boilers delivering steam to an inclined triple expansion engine that turned a crankshaft attached to feathering paddle-wheels on the port and starboard sides. She was the last of the great Day Line "side-wheelers", and the last of her kind to ply the Hudson River.

See also
National Register of Historic Places listings in Monmouth County, New Jersey
PS Washington Irving - another Hudson River Day Line steamboat.

References

External links

 A YouTube video about the PS Alexander Hamilton

1924 ships
Steamboats of the Hudson River
Paddle steamers of the United States
Ships on the National Register of Historic Places in New Jersey
Buildings and structures in Monmouth County, New Jersey
Middletown Township, New Jersey
National Register of Historic Places in Monmouth County, New Jersey
New Jersey Register of Historic Places
Ships named for Founding Fathers of the United States